Mario Bacher (September 6, 1941 – July 16, 2014) is a former Italian ski mountaineer and cross-country skier.

Bacher was born in Formazza. He participated at the 1968 Winter Olympics, when he placed 12th in the 50 kilometres race of cross-country skiing. Together with Lino Jordan and Franco Ceroni he placed 3rd in the Trofeo Mezzalama ski mountaineering competition.

Further notable results were:
 1966: 2nd, Italian men's championships of cross-country skiing, 50 km
 1968: 2nd, Italian men's championships of cross-country skiing, 30 km

External links 
 Mario Bacher at sportsreferences.com

References 

1941 births
2014 deaths
Italian male ski mountaineers
Olympic cross-country skiers of Italy
Cross-country skiers at the 1968 Winter Olympics
Italian male cross-country skiers